Genipin is a chemical compound found in Genipa americana fruit extract.  It is an aglycone derived from an iridoid glycoside called geniposide which is also present in fruit of Gardenia jasminoides. 

Genipin is an excellent natural cross-linker for proteins, collagen, gelatin, and chitosan cross-linking. It has a low acute toxicity, with  i.v. 382 mg/kg in mice, therefore, much less toxic than glutaraldehyde and many other commonly used synthetic cross-linking reagents. Furthermore, genipin can be used as a regulating agent for drug delivery, as the raw material for gardenia blue pigment preparation, and as the intermediate for alkaloid syntheses.

The blue color of genipin is stabilized in milk due to the natural pH of milk 

In vitro experiments have shown that genipin blocks the action of the transporter uncoupling protein 2.

References 

Iridoids
Diols
Carboxylate esters
Cyclopentenes